Unplugged is the eighth album by South Korean hip-hop duo Leessang. The album was released on May 25, 2012. The album contains 13 songs.

Track listing

References

2012 albums
Korean-language albums
Leessang albums